Vincent Landay is a Canadian-American film producer. He has worked with Spike Jonze on his music videos and feature films since 1993. Some of the movies he has produced include Being John Malkovich and Where the Wild Things Are, as well as the 2010 Canadian short film Higglety Pigglety Pop! or There Must Be More to Life, created for the Blu-ray release of  Where the Wild Things Are.
He has made music videos for Kanye West, REM, Jay Z and many more artists.

Filmography
He was a producer in all films unless otherwise noted.

Film

Production manager

Music department

Thanks

Television

Miscellaneous crew

Second unit director or assistant director

References

External links

Canadian film producers
Living people
Year of birth missing (living people)